Brunet (male) or brunette (female) refers to a person with brown hair.

Brunet may also refer to:
 Brunet (surname)
 Brunet (pharmacy), a chain located in Quebec, Canada
 Brunet, Alpes-de-Haute-Provence, a commune of the Alpes-de-Haute-Provence département, France
 Brunet Castle, historic castle in Chile